Alexander Fedorovich von Moller (1796–1862) was an Imperial Russian division commander. He took in the suppression of the uprising in Poland.

Awards 
 Order of Saint George, 4th degree, 1833
 Order of Saint Stanislaus (House of Romanov), 1st class, 1834
 Order of Saint Anna, 1st class, 1838
 Order of Saint Vladimir, 3rd class, 1845
 Order of the White Eagle (Russian Empire), 1847
 Order of Saint Alexander Nevsky, 1849

Sources 
 Волков С. В. Генералитет Российской империи. Энциклопедический словарь генералов и адмиралов от Петра I до Николая II. Том II. Л—Я. — М., 2009. — С. 164. 
 История лейб-гвардии Егерского полка за сто лет. 1796–1896. Составлена офицерами полка. СПб., 1896
 Степанов В. С., Григорович П. И. В память столетнего юбилея императорского Военного ордена Святого великомученика и Победоносца Георгия. (1769–1869). СПб., 1869
 Алфавит декабристов

1796 births
1862 deaths
Russian people of the November Uprising
Recipients of the Order of Saint Stanislaus (Russian), 1st class
Recipients of the Order of St. Anna, 1st class
Recipients of the Order of St. Vladimir, 3rd class
Recipients of the Order of the White Eagle (Russia)